is a 2018 Japanese television anime series produced by OLM. Part of the Inazuma Eleven franchise, it is a sequel to Inazuma Eleven: Ares that was broadcast between April and September 2018. It began airing on TV Tokyo and its affiliates from October 2018 to September 2019.

Plot summary
Orion no Kokuin revolves around a team called "Inazuma Japan"—composed of the best players of the previous Inazuma Eleven installments—that will act as a Japanese national team and will face teams from around the world. First announced at "Inazuma Eleven Fes. 2018 + Japan National Team Roster Announcement", Orion no Kokuin continues from where Inazuma Eleven: Ares ended, covering Inazuma Japan's matches in the FFI. The story focuses on Inamori Asuto, Haizaki Ryouhei, Nosaka Yuuma and new character Ichihoshi Hikaru.

Cast
 Ayumu Murase as Inamori Asuto (Sonny Wright)
 Nojima Hirofumi as Gouenji Shuuya (Axel Blaze)
 Kamiya Hiroshi as Haizaki Ryouhei (Eliot Ember)
 Hiroyuki Yoshino as Kidou Yuuto (Jude Sharp)
 Fukuyama Jun as Nosaka Yuuma (Heath Moore)
 Takeuchi Junko as Endou Mamoru (Mark Evans)
 Suzumura Kenichi as Nishikage Seiya
 Miyake Kenta as Iwato Takashi
 Miyano Mamoru as Fubuki Shirou/Atsuya
 Takahashi Rie as Sakanoue Naboru
 Shunsuke Takeuchi as Goujin Tetsunosuke
 Sōma Saitō as Hiura Kirina
 Mizushima Takahiro as Kiyama Tatsuya
 Sakurai Takahiro as Mansaku Yuuichirou
 Hikida Takashi as Saginuma Osamu
 Tomohiro Oomachi as Ichihoshi Mitsuru (As a person in his younger brother's body, Ichihoshi Hikaru)
 Toshiki Masuda as Kira Hiroto
 Yuichi Nakamura as Zhao Jin Yun
 Yuka Nishigaki as Kazemaru Ichirouta
 Yūki Kaji as Fudou Akio

Music
 Opening 1: "Butai wa Dekkai Hou ga Ii! (舞台はデッカイほうがいい！)" by Pugcat's (From ep 1 to ep 21)
 Opening 2: "Chikyuu wo Kick! (地球をキック！)" by Pugcat's (From ep 22 to ep 49)
 Ending 1: "Suisei Girls (彗星ガールズ, Suisei Gaaruzu)" by Alom (From ep 1 to ep 21)
 Ending 2: "Summer Zombie (サマーゾンビ)" by Alom (From ep 22 to 36)
 Ending 3: "Ashita e no Bye Bye (明日あしたへのBye Bye)" by Urashima Sakatasen (From ep 37 to ep 49)

Episode list

References

External links
 Inazuma Eleven Series (meta series official site) 
 Inazuma World 
 TV Tokyo Inazuma Eleven: Orion no Kokuin site 
 

2018 anime television series debuts
Anime television series based on video games
Association football in anime and manga
Inazuma Eleven (anime)
OLM, Inc.
Science fiction anime and manga
TV Tokyo original programming